"My Kind of Woman/My Kind of Man" is a song written by and recorded by American country music artist Vince Gill, who recorded it as a duet with ex-labelmate Patty Loveless.  It was released in May 1999 as the fourth single from Gill's album The Key and the second single from Loveless' compilation album Classics.

After the release of Loveless' studio album Long Stretch of Lonesome in late 1997, she collaborated with Gill in a series of recording sessions which were produced by Gill and Tony Brown.  Two of the recordings were eventually released, "My Kind of Woman, My Kind of Man" along with "Wine, Women And Song".  Gill and Loveless debuted the song on The Tonight Show with Jay Leno upon its release in 1999.

The song charted for 20 weeks on the Billboard Hot Country Singles and Tracks chart, reaching #27 during the week of July 31, 1999. It also reached #16 on the Bubbling Under Hot 100 chart. "My Kind of Woman/My Kind of Man" won the Country Music Association's 1999 award for Vocal Event of the Year.

Chart positions

References

1999 singles
Vince Gill songs
Patty Loveless songs
Male–female vocal duets
Songs written by Vince Gill
Song recordings produced by Tony Brown (record producer)
MCA Records singles
1998 songs